The 1936 Vuelta a España was the 2nd Vuelta a España.This cycling race took place from 5 May to 31 May 1936. The second edition of the Vuelta began under a volatile political and social situation and several weeks after the race was over, Spain was plunged into its civil war. The race was anticipated to see a battle between the previous winner Belgian Gustaaf Deloor and the second-place finisher of 1935 Spaniard Mariano Canardo. However a crash during the early stages of the race ruled Canardo out of the runnings. While Deloor led the race from the second stage to the finish, his brother Alfons climbed up the classification and when second placed Spaniard Antonio Escuriet suffered exhaustion on the penultimate day, Alfons rode himself into the second place overall. Fifty riders began the race and only twenty four finished the race in Madrid on 31 May. Afterward the Vuelta was suspended during the civil war where riders such as Julian Berrendero had to do military service and were also imprisoned during the war.

The leader of the general classification wore an orange jersey, while the last-placed cyclist wore a red garment. The Spanish other cyclists wore grey jerseys, and the other foreign cyclists wore green jerseys.

Route and stages

Classification leadership

Final standings

General classification

There were 26 cyclists who had completed all fourteen stages. For these cyclists, the times they had needed in each stage was added up for the general classification. The cyclist with the least accumulated time was the winner.

Mountains classification

References

 
1936
1936 in Spanish sport
1936 in road cycling